"We're Gonna Win Twins" is the fight song for the Minnesota Twins, played when the team takes the field before any home game. It has been used since the team moved to Minnesota in 1961.

"We're Gonna Win Twins" is a collaboration between Ray Charles (not to be confused with Ray Charles) and Dick Wilson (not to be confused with Dick Wilson). Wilson, an advertising executive and jingle writer, composed the music. The Twins bought the rights to the song from advertising agency Campbell Mithun for one dollar. The team asked Charles to revise the lyrics. The singers are Kathy Mueller, Scott Nelson, Steve McCloon, and Mary Jane Alm. The only lyrics change from the 1960s to the present was the change of the line "crack out a home run" to "knock out a home run" during the 1980s.

External links
http://www.startribune.com/templates/Print_This_Story?sid=17098651

Major League Baseball fight songs
Minnesota Twins
Year of song missing
Song articles with missing songwriters